Marina Alcalde Rodriguez (born April 29, 1987) is a Brazilian mixed martial artist (MMA). She currently competes in the Strawweight division in the Ultimate Fighting Championship (UFC). As of February 27, 2023, she is #5 in the UFC women's strawweight rankings, and as of March 7, 2023, she is #14 in the UFC women's pound-for-pound rankings.

Background 
Rodriguez was born in Bagé, Brazil. She has two brothers, Gabriel and Roberto, of whom the latter is a two-time Parapan American Games gold medalist in swimming. In her youth, Rodriguez played football, volley, basketball, and handball. Growing tired of the lack of physical exercise in her job as a graphic designer, she started looking for a way to lose some gained weight. Then, she found her now coach, Marcio Malko. Eventually, she joined a muay Thai class in 2013 and soon thereafter started taking amateur bouts.

Mixed martial arts career

Early career 
Rodriguez started her professional MMA career in 2015 and fought primarily in Brazil and amassed a record of 9–0 before competing in Dana White's Contender Series Brazil .

Dana White's Tuesday Night Contender Series 
Rodriguez appeared in Dana White's Contender Series (DWCS) Dana White's Contender Series Brazil 2 web-series program on August 11, 2018, facing Maria de Oliveira Neta. She won the fight via technical knockout in the first round.

Ultimate Fighting Championship
Rodriguez made her UFC debut on September 22, 2018 against Randa Markos at UFC Fight Night: Santos vs. Anders.  The back and forth contest was ultimately ruled a majority draw.

Her next fight came on UFC on March 30, 2019 at UFC on ESPN: Barboza vs. Gaethje against Jessica Aguilar.  She won the fight via unanimous decision.

Rodriguez faced Tecia Torres on August 10, 2019 at UFC on ESPN+ 14.  She won the fight via unanimous decision.

Rodriguez faced Cynthia Calvillo, replacing injured Cláudia Gadelha, on December 7, 2019 at UFC on ESPN 7. At the weigh-ins, Calvillo weighed in at 120.5 pounds, 4.5 pounds over the strawweight non-title fight limit of 116. The bout against Rodriguez will be held at a catchweight. Calvillo was fined 30% her purse, which went to her opponent Rodriguez. After three rounds of fighting, the bout ended with a majority draw.

Rodriguez was expected to face Carla Esparza on July 15, 2020 at UFC Fight Night 172. However the bout was cancelled after one of Rodriguez's cornermen tested positive for COVID-19. The pair eventually fought at UFC on ESPN 14 on July 26, 2020. Rodriguez lost the fight via split decision.

Rodriguez faced Amanda Ribas, replacing Michelle Waterson, on January 24, 2021 at UFC 257. Rodriguez won the fight via technical knockout in round two. This win earned her the Performance of the Night  award.

As the first fight of her new, multi-fight contract Rodriguez faced Michelle Waterson in a flyweight bout on May 8, 2021 at UFC on ESPN 24. She won the fight via unanimous decision.

Rodriguez faced Mackenzie Dern on October 9, 2021 on UFC Fight Night 194. She won the fight via unanimous decision. This fight earned her the Fight of the Night award.

Rodriguez faced Yan Xiaonan on March 5, 2022 at UFC 272. She won the fight via split decision.

Rodriguez was expected to face Amanda Lemos at UFC 280, but the bout was postponed to UFC Fight Night 214 for unknown reasons. She lost the fight via technical knockout in the third round.

Rodriguez is scheduled to face Virna Jandiroba on May 6, 2023, at UFC 288.

Championships and awards

Mixed martial arts
Ultimate Fighting Championship
Performance of the Night (One time) 
Fight of the Night (One time)

Mixed martial arts record

|-
|Loss
|align=center|16–2–2
|Amanda Lemos
|TKO (punches)
|UFC Fight Night: Rodriguez vs. Lemos
|
|align=center|3
|align=center|0:54
|Las Vegas, Nevada, United States
|
|-
|Win
|align=center|16–1–2
|Yan Xiaonan
|Decision (split)
|UFC 272
|
|align=center|3
|align=center|5:00
|Las Vegas, Nevada, United States
|
|-
|Win
|align=center|15–1–2
|Mackenzie Dern
|Decision (unanimous)
|UFC Fight Night: Dern vs. Rodriguez
|
|align=center|5
|align=center|5:00
|Las Vegas, Nevada, United States
|
|-
|Win
|align=center|14–1–2
|Michelle Waterson
|Decision (unanimous)
|UFC on ESPN: Rodriguez vs. Waterson
|
|align=center|5
|align=center|5:00
|Las Vegas, Nevada, United States
|
|-
|Win
|align=center|13–1–2
|Amanda Ribas
|TKO (elbow and punches)
|UFC 257 
|
|align=center|2
|align=center|0:54
|Abu Dhabi, United Arab Emirates
| 
|-
|Loss
|align=center|12–1–2
|Carla Esparza
|Decision (split)
|UFC on ESPN: Whittaker vs. Till 
|
|align=center|3
|align=center|5:00
|Abu Dhabi, United Arab Emirates
|
|-
|Draw
|align=center|
|Cynthia Calvillo
|Draw (majority)
|UFC on ESPN: Overeem vs. Rozenstruik 
|
|align=center|3
|align=center|5:00
|Washington, D.C., United States
|
|-
|Win
|align=center|12–0–1
|Tecia Torres
|Decision (unanimous)
|UFC Fight Night: Shevchenko vs. Carmouche 2
|
|align=center|3
|align=center|5:00
|Montevideo, Uruguay
|
|-
|Win
|align=center|11–0–1
|Jessica Aguilar
|Decision (unanimous)
|UFC on ESPN: Barboza vs. Gaethje
|
|align=center|3
|align=center|5:00
|Philadelphia, Pennsylvania United States
|
|-
|Draw
|align=center|10–0–1
|Randa Markos
|Draw (majority)
|UFC Fight Night: Santos vs. Anders
|
|align=center|3
|align=center|5:00
|São Paulo, Brazil
|
|-
|Win
|align=center|10–0
|Maria de Oliveira Neta
|TKO (punches)
|Dana White's Contender Series Brazil 2
|
|align=center|1
|align=center|3:03
|Las Vegas, Nevada, United States
|
|-
|Win
|align=center|9–0
|Natalia Cristina da Silva
|Decision (unanimous)
|Thunder Fight 14 
|
|align=center|3
|align=center|5:00
|São Paulo, Brazil
|
|-
|Win
|align=center|8–0
|Amanda Torres Sardinha
|Decision (unanimous)
|Shooto Brazil 79
|
|align=center|3
|align=center|5:00
|Rio de Janeiro, Brazil
|
|-
|Win
|align=center|7–0
|Samara Santos Cunha
|Decision (unanimous)
|Fight 2 Night 2
|
|align=center|3
|align=center|5:00
|Foz do Iguaçu, Brazil
|
|-
|Win
|align=center|6–0
|Paula Vieira da Silva
|TKO (punches)
|Curitiba Top Fight 10
|
|align=center|1
|align=center|4:50
|Curitiba, Brazil
|
|-
|Win
|align=center|5–0
|Vanessa Guimaraes
|Submission (triangle choke)
|Aspera FC 41
|
|align=center|2
|align=center|1:47
|São José, Brazil
|
|-
|Win
|align=center|4–0
|Márcia Oliveira
|TKO (punches)
|Floripa Fight Championship: The Big Challenge
|
|align=center|1
|align=center|1:42
|Florianópolis, Brazil
|
|-
|Win
|align=center|3–0
|Caroline Silva
|TKO (knee and punches)
|Aspera FC 33
|
|align=center|2
|align=center|0:47
|São José, Brazil
|
|-
|Win
|align=center|2–0
|Caroline Silva
|Decision (unanimous)
|Aspera FC 24
|
|align=center|3
|align=center|5:00
|São José, Brazil
|
|-
|Win
|align=center|1–0
|Silvania Monteiro
|TKO (retirement)
|São José Super Fight 6
|
|align=center|1
|align=center|5:00
|São José, Brazil
|
|-

See also
List of current UFC fighters
List of female mixed martial artists

References

External links
 
 

1987 births
Living people
People from Bagé
Strawweight mixed martial artists
Mixed martial artists utilizing Muay Thai
Mixed martial artists utilizing Brazilian jiu-jitsu
Brazilian female mixed martial artists
Brazilian Muay Thai practitioners
Female Muay Thai practitioners
Brazilian practitioners of Brazilian jiu-jitsu
Female Brazilian jiu-jitsu practitioners
Ultimate Fighting Championship female fighters
Sportspeople from Rio Grande do Sul